Den hemmelighetsfulle leiligheten is a 1948 Norwegian drama film directed by Tancred Ibsen, starring Ola Isene and Sonja Wigert. The film is based on a short story by Kristian Elster. A bachelor in his forties buys an apartment owned by an artist who died a sudden death. The peculiar atmosphere of the place, and the sudden appearance of the artist's girlfriend, shakes the conservative man out of his habits.

External links
 
 

1948 films
1948 drama films
Norwegian drama films
Norwegian black-and-white films
1940s Norwegian-language films
Films directed by Tancred Ibsen